Kanokupolu is a village on Tongatapu. The population is 354. it is the originating seat (in the beginning of the 17th century) of the Tui Kanokupolu dynasty, to which the current king of Tonga still traces his descent. The people of Kanokupolu are the only ones allowed to dress in a particular lakalaka costume, called the folaosi, when they perform this dance.

History 
The village's name means "the flesh (the essence) of Upolu" (Samoa). The name was given when Samoans led by Ngata, son of war chief ‘Ama, migrated to Tonga from Safata, Upolu after a heavy defeat in battle at the hands of the combined forces of Atua and A’ana. The expedition is believed to be the last great exodus of peoples from Samoa and, having arrived in the area now known as Kanokupolu, Ngata eventually rose to become Tu’i Kanokupolu and ruler over all of Tonga. 

81 houses in the village were destroyed by Cyclone Isaac in 1982.

References

Populated places in Tonga
Tongatapu